Jonathan Andrew Eisen (born August 31, 1968) is an American evolutionary biologist, currently working at University of California, Davis. His academic research is in the fields of evolutionary biology, genomics and microbiology and he is the academic editor-in-chief of the open access journal PLOS Biology.

Education
Eisen completed his undergraduate studies at Harvard College in 1990, earning an AB degree in biology. He graduated as a Doctor of Philosophy from Stanford University in 1998 with a thesis on the evolution of DNA repair genes, proteins, and processes in 1998, supervised by Philip Hanawalt.

Research

Eisen's research focuses on the origin of novelty, how new processes and functions originate in living things. To study this, he focuses on sequencing and analyzing genomes of organisms, especially microbes and using phylogenomic analysis.

Eisen together with Nick Barton, Derek E.G. Briggs, David B. Goldstein, and Nipam H. Patel is an author of the undergraduate textbook, Evolution, that integrates molecular biology, genomics, and human genetics with traditional evolutionary studies. According to Google Scholar his most cited peer-reviewed papers are on the genome sequence of Plasmodium falciparum, sequencing the Sargasso Sea and a paper on the genome of Thermotoga maritima.

Prior to working at UC Davis he was an Investigator at The Institute for Genomic Research.

Eisen and his work is routinely discussed in the scientific and popular press. Examples include a New York Times article on the Genomic Encyclopedia of Bacteria and Archaea in 2009 and extensive coverage of work on searching for a "fourth domain" of life. In addition, Eisen's blogging and microblogging work is frequently written about including for example. His brother Michael Eisen is also a biologist.

Awards and honors
Eisen was awarded the Benjamin Franklin Award (Bioinformatics) in 2011 and the Esquire Magazine's Best and Brightest in 2002. He was awarded the Walter J. Gores Award, Faculty Achievement Awards for Excellence in Teaching. He was elected a Fellow of the American Society for Microbiology (FAAM).

References

External links

 Jonathan Eisen's Lab
 

1960s births
Living people
21st-century American biologists
American bioinformaticians
Harvard College alumni
Stanford University alumni
University of California, Davis faculty
Articles containing video clips
American scientists
Fellows of the American Academy of Microbiology